Buckwha Creek is a  tributary of Aquashicola Creek in the Poconos of eastern Pennsylvania in the United States.

The creek originates in a swamp to the southwest of Saylorsburg, flowing southwest along the northwest side of Chestnut Ridge. About five miles below its source, it is dammed to form Princess Lake, about a mile above Kunkletown.

Tributaries
Hunter Creek
Borger Creek
Chapple Creek
Princess Run

See also
List of rivers of Pennsylvania

References

Tributaries of the Lehigh River
Rivers of Pennsylvania
Pocono Mountains
Rivers of Monroe County, Pennsylvania
Rivers of Carbon County, Pennsylvania